The Beach Lighthouse (also known as the Lower Light) is a  tall sandstone lighthouse in Fleetwood, Lancashire, England.

History
The lighthouse was designed in 1839 by Decimus Burton and Capt H.M. Denham.  Burton had been commissioned three years previously by Sir Peter Hesketh Fleetwood as the architect of the new town of Fleetwood. Unusual for a lighthouse, it is in neoclassical style with a square colonnaded base, square tower, and octagonal lantern and gallery.

The Lower Light stands on Fleetwood sea front and was built with its counterpart—the Upper Light, or Pharos Lighthouse—to provide a navigational guide to shipping entering the Wyre estuary. Together the lights provide a leading line when the Pharos Light is directly above that of the Lower Light.

Both lighthouses were first illuminated 1 December 1840. Each was run off the town's gas supply, with a single parabolic reflector placed behind the burner; later they were converted to electricity.

The Beach Lighthouse was designated a Grade II listed building by English Heritage on 26 April 1950. The lighthouse is managed by the Port of Fleetwood.

See also

 List of lighthouses in England
 Listed buildings in Fleetwood

References

Sources
H N Denham, Sailing directions from Port Lynas to Liverpool...  Mawdsley, Liverpool, 1840

External links

Lighthouses completed in 1840
Buildings and structures in Fleetwood
Grade II listed buildings in Lancashire
Lighthouses in England
Tourist attractions in the Borough of Wyre
Grade II listed lighthouses
Decimus Burton buildings